Dance Dance Dragon is a Singaporean comedy film from Mediacorp Raintree Pictures and Golden Village Pictures that was released for Chinese New Year on January 19, 2012 in Singapore and in March in Malaysia. It is MediaCorp Raintree Pictures's last film. It was produced by most of the production team of It's a Great, Great World. The cast includes artistes from both Singapore and Malaysia.

Plot
As Chinese New Year 2012 marks the year of the Dragon, the film explores the Chinese's age-old obsession with the Dragon and having children on a "Dragon year" (see Chinese zodiac). In the introduction, Ah Long (Melvin Sia) tells about how his father (Zheng Geping) was desperate to have a son born in the Dragon year because his ancestors had decreed that only a "Dragon boy" could take over the family's Dragon dance and Lion dance association. His mother (younger, Pan Lingling and older, Lai Meng) instead gives birth to "Dragon girls" while Ah Long himself was born several seconds after the clock struck twelve, making him a "Snake baby", much to the disappointment of his father.

At present time, Mother Long prays to the gods for blessings on her three children and pours out her desire for a grandchild. The oldest daughter Lucy, 48, is a spinster and can't find suitable work. The second daughter Ah Bee, 36, is a gambling addiction counselor who is tomboyish and was recently dumped by her boyfriend. The youngest and only son Ah Long is married but is terrified of children.

Meanwhile, up in heaven, the gods are growing sick and tired of hearing Mother Long's daily prayers for a grandchild and deliberate whether to grant Mother Long her wish.

Cast
Lai Meng
Kym Ng as Long Ah Bee
Dennis Chew as Lucy Long
Adrian Pang as Eric Tan
Melvin Sia as Ah Long
Zheng Geping
Pan Lingling
Belinda Lee as midwife
Bryan Wong as Uncle Teck
Chen Huihui
Marcus Chin as Ah Gui
John Cheng as Ah Gao
Brandon Wong
Patricia Mok
Dawn Yeoh as Ah Long’s wife

References

2012 films
Singaporean comedy films
Chinese-language films
Southern Min-language films
2010s English-language films